N. Bruce McLeod (born 1930) is a former Moderator of the United Church of Canada (1972–1974). He has a doctorate in preaching from Union Theological Seminary in New York.

Once the minister of Bloor Street United Church in downtown Toronto and a frequent columnist in the United Church Observer, as Moderator McLeod practised extensive outreach via television and by ministry in shopping malls and elsewhere in the world beyond traditional congregational worship. He envisioned a United Church of Canada that would become more open and welcoming to new ideas than had previously been the case, and one in which regional sensibilities as to then-current issues such as abortion would be given credibility. During his term, McLeod also succeeded in encouraging more friendly relations between Jews and the United Church of Canada.

In the 1981 provincial election, McLeod was the Ontario Liberal Party's candidate in the Toronto riding of St. George, where he finished second behind Susan Fish.

Notes

1930 births
Living people
Members of the United Church of Canada
Ministers of the United Church of Canada
Moderators of the United Church of Canada
Clergy from Toronto
Union Theological Seminary (New York City) alumni
Upper Canada College alumni
Ontario Liberal Party candidates in Ontario provincial elections